Hampton is an unincorporated community and census-designated place (CDP) in Baltimore County, Maryland, United States. The population was 5,052 at the 2010 census. Hampton is often considered a subdivision of the nearby community of Towson and is located just north of Baltimore, about twenty minutes from downtown. Hampton contains residences situated on lots up to several acres in a park-like setting (current zoning limits density to not more than two residential units per acre). The community is anchored by its principal landmark, the Hampton National Historic Site. The Towson United Methodist Church is located in Hampton, flanked on the south by I-695 and Goucher College.

History
In ancient times, the land was frequented by Susquehannock Indians, who used what became nearby Joppa Road as a trail. The area now known as Hampton was originally part of a land grant given to a relative of Lord Baltimore in 1695. His heirs sold the land on April 2, 1745, to Col. Charles Ridgely (1702–72), a tobacco farmer and trader. In the latter half of the 18th century, the Hampton Mansion was built by the Ridgely family, who used the surrounding land for farming, including apple orchards and the breeding of thoroughbred race horses, along with slave quarters.

Succeeding generations of Ridgelys continued to own the land until 1929, when the Hampton Development Company was formed and the land around the Hampton Mansion was subdivided, creating the modern Hampton community. The Hampton Mansion continued to be owned by the Ridgely family until 1948, when the house and the remaining  of the Ridgely estate were designated a National Historic Site and sold to a preservation trust, eventually to be acquired and now operated by the National Park Service.

In 2008, the church announced plans to sell a  outparcel of undeveloped, wooded property to a developer for construction of a senior housing complex. A zoning change application was submitted to Baltimore County to increase density to 16 residential units per acre. However, the Hampton Improvement Association, representing neighborhood residents, objected, saying they "oppose zoning changes that would allow higher density residential development and require trees to be knocked down". The church subsequently dropped plans for the development, saying it wished to remain a good neighbor. The church now has a walking path in the forested area for meditation, open to the public during daylight hours.

Geography
Hampton is located at  (39.4229, -76.5847).

Climate
The climate in this area is characterized by hot, humid summers and generally mild to cool winters.  According to the Köppen Climate Classification system, Hampton has a humid subtropical climate, abbreviated "Cfa" on climate maps.

Demographics

As of the census of 2000, there were 5,004 people, 1,900 households, and 1,578 families residing in the CDP. The racial makeup of the CDP was 91.41% White, 1.48% African American, 6.00% Asian, 0.02% Pacific Islander, 0.22% from other races, and 0.88% from two or more races. Hispanic or Latino of any race were 1.48% of the population.

There were 1,900 households, out of which 29.1% had children under the age of 18 living with them, 75.3% were married couples living together, 5.7% had a female householder with no husband present, and 16.9% were non-families. 14.3% of all households were made up of individuals, and 8.8% had someone living alone who was 65 years of age or older. The average household size was 2.62 and the average family size was 2.89.

In the CDP, the population was spread out, with 21.9% under the age of 18, 4.1% from 18 to 24, 19.3% from 25 to 44, 30.1% from 45 to 64, and 24.5% who were 65 years of age or older. The median age was 48 years. For every 100 females, there were 94.2 males. For every 100 females age 18 and over, there were 91.5 males.

The median income for a household in the CDP was $95,546, and the median income for a family was $100,240. Males had a median income of $75,518 versus $42,479 for females. The per capita income for the CDP was $43,850. About 0.4% of families and 1.8% of the population were below the poverty line, including 1.3% of those under age 18 and 2.6% of those age 65 or over.

Schools

Hampton is served by these public schools:

Hampton Elementary
Cromwell Valley Elementary (Magnet)
Dumbarton Middle School
Ridgely Middle School
Loch Raven Technical Academy
Loch Raven High School
Towson High School

Notre Dame Preparatory School, a private, Catholic school for girls, is located in Hampton.

References

External links

Hampton Improvement Association

Census-designated places in Maryland
Census-designated places in Baltimore County, Maryland